State Route 350 (SR 350) is a state highway in Greene County, Tennessee.

Route description
SR 350 begins in Greeneville unsigned with a concurrency with US 11E Bus and SR 70 at their intersection with US 11E, it continues south where SR 70 heads south and SR 350 and US 11E Bus head east to US 321 and SR 107 where SR 350 heads south along US 321 and US 11E Bus heads north, it then branches off of US 321 heads more southeastward to end at SR 351 in south central Greene County south of Greeneville and north of Camp Creek.

The entire route is in Greene County.

Major intersections

References

Transportation in Greene County, Tennessee
350